Lawrence Marvin Clay-Bey (born December 14, 1965) is an American former professional boxer who fought at heavyweight. As an amateur he was a two-time winner (1995 and 1996) of the United States National Championships as well as a bronze medalist at the 1995 World Championships, all in the super heavyweight division.

Amateur career 
Lawrence Clay-Bey started to box at the age of 26. He lost his first two amateur fights but stuck with it and eventually won the National Golden Gloves in his next eight fights. At this point he weighed around 260 pounds.

Clay-Bey won a super heavyweight bronze medal at the 1995 World Amateur Boxing Championships in Berlin, later KOd Joe Mesi to win the right to go to the 1996 Summer Olympics in Atlanta, Georgia and was also team USA's captain. However he was put out of the tournament in his first fight by a close/controversial 10-8 decision to eventual Gold medalist Wladimir Klitschko. He was the only fighter Klitschko had problems with as he managed to rattle Klitschko, prompting the referee to issue a standing 8 count. After the fight he raised some eyebrows downplaying it as "just a loss" which let journalists question his dedication. He finished the amateurs with a 60-9 record.

 United States amateur (AAU) Super Heavyweight champion (1995, 1996)

Professional career 
After a year of debating if he wanted to turn pro Lawrence Clay-Bey decided he wanted to see how far he could go.  He got into much better shape and shed 25-30 pounds to a better fighting weight of 235. He turned pro in 1997 and he easily blew past his early opponents despite them having more experience and glossy pro records.  Clay-Bey was thought very highly of, and was being groomed to be a future title holder until he met the streaking Clifford Etienne in 2000. The two traded shots round after round with Etienne being the more active of the two, and Etienne took the decision. After the loss to Etienne, Clay-Bey began putting on weight and coming into fights out of shape.  But he stayed busy and took a victory over promising prospect Charles Shufford in 2003, setting up a fight against Eliecer Castillo.  Castillo KO'd Clay-Bey in the 9th round.  Clay-Bey's once promising career drifted into obscurity.  Although he was able to beat former cruiserweight champ Imamu Mayfield in 2004, he dropped a decision to Sinan Samil Sam and drew with Derek Bryant in 2005.

Professional boxing record

Personal life
He now works as a corrections officer in Connecticut. He is married with 5 children.

References

External links
 

1965 births
Living people
Boxers from Connecticut
Heavyweight boxers
Boxers at the 1996 Summer Olympics
Olympic boxers of the United States
National Golden Gloves champions
Winners of the United States Championship for amateur boxers
American prison officers
Sportspeople from Hartford, Connecticut
American male boxers
AIBA World Boxing Championships medalists